Cosmogony is any model concerning the origin of the cosmos or the universe.

Overview

Scientific theories 

In astronomy, cosmogony refers to the study of the origin of particular astrophysical objects or systems, and is most commonly used in reference to the origin of the universe, the Solar System, or the Earth–Moon system. The prevalent cosmological model of the early development of the universe is the Big Bang theory.

Sean M. Carroll, who specializes in theoretical cosmology and field theory, explains two competing explanations for the origins of the singularity, which is the center of a space in which a characteristic is limitless (one example is the singularity of a black hole, where gravity is the characteristic that becomes infinite).

It is generally accepted that the universe began at a point of singularity. When the singularity of the universe started to expand, the Big Bang occurred, which evidently began the universe. The other explanation, held by proponents such as Stephen Hawking, asserts that time did not exist when it emerged along with the universe. This assertion implies that the universe does not have a beginning, as time did not exist "prior" to the universe. Hence, it is unclear whether properties such as space or time emerged with the singularity and the known universe.

Despite the research, there is currently no theoretical model that explains the earliest moments of the universe's existence (during the Planck epoch) due to a lack of a testable theory of quantum gravity. Nevertheless, researchers of string theory, its extensions (such as M-theory), and of loop quantum cosmology, like Barton Zwiebach and Washington Taylor, have proposed solutions to assist in the explanation of the universe's earliest moments. Cosmogonists have only tentative theories for the early stages of the universe and its beginning. The proposed theoretical scenarios include string theory, M-theory, the Hartle—Hawking initial state, string landscape, cosmic inflation, the Big Bang, and the ekpyrotic universe. Some of these proposed scenarios, like the string theory, are compatible, whereas others are not.

Mythology 

In mythology, creation or cosmogonic myths are narratives describing the beginning of the universe or cosmos.

Some methods of the creation of the universe in mythology include:

 the will or action of a supreme being or beings, 
 the process of metamorphosis, 
 the copulation of female and male deities,
 from chaos,
 or via a cosmic egg.

Creation myths may be etiological, attempting to provide explanations for the origin of the universe. For instance, Eridu Genesis, the oldest known creation myth, contains an account of the creation of the world in which the universe was created out of a primeval sea (Abzu). Creation myths vary, but they may share similar deities or symbols. For instance, the ruler of the gods in Greek mythology, Zeus, is similar to the ruler of the gods in Roman mythology, Jupiter. Another example is the ruler of the gods in Tagalog mythology, Bathala, who is similar to various rulers of certain pantheons within Philippine mythology such as the Bisaya's Kaptan.

Compared with cosmology 
In the humanities, the distinction between cosmogony and cosmology is blurred. For example, in theology, the cosmological argument for the existence of God (pre-cosmic cosmogonic bearer of personhood) is an appeal to ideas concerning the origin of the universe and is thus cosmogonical. Some religious cosmogonies have an impersonal first cause (for example Taoism).

However, in astronomy, cosmogony can be distinguished from cosmology, which studies the universe and its existence, but does not necessarily inquire into its origins. There is therefore a scientific distinction between cosmological and cosmogonical ideas. Physical cosmology is the science that attempts to explain all observations relevant to the development and characteristics of the universe on its largest scale. Some questions regarding the behaviour of the universe have been described by some physicists and cosmologists as being extra-scientific or metaphysical. Attempted solutions to such questions may include the extrapolation of scientific theories to untested regimes (such as the Planck epoch), or the inclusion of philosophical or religious ideas.

See also 

Why there is anything at all

References

External links

 
Creation myths
Greek words and phrases
Natural philosophy
Origins
Physical cosmology
Concepts in astronomy